The discography of singer-songwriter, Tsuyoshi Nagabuchi.

Albums

Singles and other tracks

Discographies of Japanese artists
Folk music discographies